Begum Para can mean:
Begum Para, is a luxurious residential area for Bangladeshi immigrants in Toronto, Canada.
Begum Para, was an Indian Hindi film actress